Hieracium caesiomurorum is a species of flowering plant belonging to the family Asteraceae.

References

caesiomurorum